Harry J. Barnes (born July 25, 1945) is an American former professional basketball player.

He played collegiately for Northeastern University and Boston Tech.

He was selected by the San Diego Rockets in the 4th round (37th pick overall) of the 1968 NBA draft.

He played for the Rockets (1968–69) in the NBA for 22 games.

External links

1945 births
Living people
American men's basketball players
Northeastern Huskies men's basketball players
San Diego Rockets players
San Diego Rockets draft picks
Small forwards